Darko Maletić (born 20 October 1980) is a Bosnian professional football manager and former player.

He holds a peculiar record: he played in the UEFA Cup for five clubs from five countries (Rapid Wien, Publikum Celje, Zenit Saint Petersburg, Partizan and Aktobe).

Club career
Maletić started his career with his hometown club FK Borac Banja Luka. In the summer of 2001 he moved to SK Rapid Wien. From January 2002 to the summer of 2004 he played for Publikum Celje of Slovenia. He then moved to Russia where he played for FC Zenit Saint Petersburg (2004) and FC Shinnik Yaroslavl (2005). After six months with Romanian club FC Vaslui (2006), Maletić signed for Serbian giants FK Partizan where he won double crown before he moved to TuS Koblenz in January 2009.

International career
When Fuad Muzurović became the Bosnian-Herzegovinian national team's coach, the 26-year-old Maletić received his first call for a match against Norway in March 2007. He made his debut in the 82nd minute, replacing Adnan Čustović. Bosnia and Herzegovina won the match 2–1.

He played seven games in the UEFA Euro 2008 qualifying but after Miroslav Blažević became coach, he dropped from the squad. After showing good form for Borac Banja Luka in the domestic league in 2011, he was recalled by coach Safet Sušić for the match against Romania in March. He was again called up for the matches against Romania away and Albania at home in June, and responded by scoring his first goal for the national team, against Albania. Maletić earned a total of 18 caps, scoring 1 goal.

His final international was a February 2012 friendly match against Brazil.

Career statistics

Honours

Player
Partizan 
Serbian SuperLiga: 2007–08
Serbian Cup: 2007–08

Borac Banja Luka 
Bosnian Premier League: 2010–11

References

External links
 
 
 
 Darko Maletić at prvaliga.si 
 Image of Darko Maletić

1980 births
Living people
Sportspeople from Banja Luka
Serbs of Bosnia and Herzegovina
Association football midfielders
Bosnia and Herzegovina footballers
Bosnia and Herzegovina international footballers
FK Borac Banja Luka players
SK Rapid Wien players
NK Celje players
FC Zenit Saint Petersburg players
FC Shinnik Yaroslavl players
FC Vaslui players
FK Partizan players
TuS Koblenz players
FC Aktobe players
FC Irtysh Pavlodar players
FK Velež Mostar players
Premier League of Bosnia and Herzegovina players
Austrian Football Bundesliga players
Slovenian PrvaLiga players
Russian Premier League players
Liga I players
Serbian SuperLiga players
2. Bundesliga players
Kazakhstan Premier League players
Bosnia and Herzegovina expatriate footballers
Expatriate footballers in Austria
Bosnia and Herzegovina expatriate sportspeople in Austria
Expatriate footballers in Slovenia
Bosnia and Herzegovina expatriate sportspeople in Slovenia
Expatriate footballers in Russia
Bosnia and Herzegovina expatriate sportspeople in Russia
Expatriate footballers in Romania
Bosnia and Herzegovina expatriate sportspeople in Romania
Expatriate footballers in Serbia
Bosnia and Herzegovina expatriate sportspeople in Serbia
Expatriate footballers in Germany
Bosnia and Herzegovina expatriate sportspeople in Germany
Expatriate footballers in Kazakhstan
Bosnia and Herzegovina expatriate sportspeople in Kazakhstan
Bosnia and Herzegovina football managers
FK Laktaši managers